John R. Goodison (1866 – December 14, 1926) was a merchant and political figure in Newfoundland. He represented Carbonear in the Newfoundland and Labrador House of Assembly from 1909 to 1917 as a member of the Newfoundland People's Party.

He was born in Carbonear, the son of the Reverend John C. Goodison and Elizabeth Ann Rorke, the daughter of John Rorke. Goodison was educated in Carbonear and in Eastbourne, England. He first entered the business established by his grandfather John Rorke, but later moved to Boston, returning to Newfoundland in 1901 and reentering the family business. Goodison served as speaker for the Newfoundland assembly from 1913 to 1917, when he resigned his seat. Goodison was then named a government purchasing agent and a public censor. He served as an inspector of lighthouses from 1918 until 1920, when he was named accountant for the Government Savings Bank.

References 

Speakers of the Newfoundland and Labrador House of Assembly
Newfoundland People's Party MHAs
1866 births
1926 deaths
People from Carbonear
Dominion of Newfoundland politicians